Arab Medical Center (AMC) is a community hospital located in Amman, Jordan. Initially established in 1994, as a center for cardiac excellence and specialty surgery, the AMC now caters for the majority of medical and surgical services both for adults and pediatric patients.
In November 2019, the hospital celebrated its Silver Jubilee (25 years of operations), with a massive marketing campaign that involved room renovations, introduction of the new Cath. Lab, and the introduction of two new digital systems for patients complaints and patients satisfaction survey, among other activities.

Medical Services
Some of the medical services and departments that AMC offers are:

 General, advanced & specialized surgeries
 Advanced cardiovascular catheterization
 Artificial kidney and dialysis unit
 ICU & CCU; care units
 Radiographic and magnetic imaging
 IVF & Infertility treatment unit
 Specialized cardiograph clinics
 Outpatient clinics
 Emergency Unit
 Comprehensive laboratories
 Endoscopy unit
 Lithotripsy unit
 Ophthalmology and Lasik unit
 Neonatal & Maternity unit

Medical Tourism Exhibitions

Under a new marketing and business development manager, AMC had a notable participation in the following medical tourism events and exhibitions:

 Annual International Conference and Exhibition of Specialized Medical Services (HIME, 2018) 15th-18 March, Bagdad – Iraq
 International Medical Tourism Exhibition & Conference (IMTEC, 2018) 24th-26 April 2018, Muscat - Oman 
 Jordan Tourism Board's Medical Tourism Road Fair 29 July – 2 August 2019, Kurdistan - Iraq
 Medical Tourism World Summit - 5th edition 28th-29 August 2019, Amman – Jordan
 International Health Care Travel Forum (IHTF2019) 26th-28 October 2019, Amman-Jordan

Arabi Care Card
In June 2018, a new pioneer loyalty program was introduced by AMC to offer discounts for customers directly on outpatient services; Laboratory, Radiology and In-Service Clinics services were set to provide card holders with discounts ranging from 10-20% on procedures or tests performed there. This was the first loyalty program among all other hospitals in Jordan.

Arabi Podcast
In late January 2020, AMC launched a new Podcast channel through SoundCloud service; this was the first such marketing venture among all Jordanian hospitals, with the aim to provide health and medical educational platform for public through hosting top physicians operating in the Jordanian private sector in various specialities. Among the first few episodes many subjects were to be discussed including; Ophthalmology, ENT, Gynecology, Endocrinology, Bariatric Surgeries, Neurology, Urology, Orthopedics, Gastroenterology and Other speciality medical conditions.

See also
Health in Jordan
Medical tourism

References

External links
 

Hospital buildings completed in 1993
Hospitals in Amman
Hospitals established in 1993
1993 establishments in Jordan